Paulina Margarita Gálvez Pineda (April 23, 1980) is a Colombian beauty queen. She became the second representative from her country to win the Miss International pageant in 1999 in Tokyo, Japan, where she was also adjudged as Miss Photogenic.

References

Colombian female models
Living people
Miss International winners
Miss International 1999 delegates
Colombian beauty pageant winners
1980 births